Action For Humanity is a UK-based global charity originally founded by a  group of doctors to provide assistance and aid to those devastated by conflict. Action For Humanity is the parent charity of Syria Relief, the largest Syria-focused NGO in the United Kingdom. Action For Humanity has operations in Syria, Yemen, Ukraine and Pakistan. In 2022, the organisation operated 306 schools inside Syria. The charity is a large recipient of United Nations funding.

The organisation has previously worked with Dr David Nott and Adam Kelwick. It's Chief Executive Officer is Othman Moqbel. The organisation's former Head of Communications and Marketing, Jessica Adams, was named Young Humanitarian Hero award in 2022 for a campaign she executed which secured the funding of 133 schools in Syria.

Through its subsidiary, Syria Relief, Action For Humanity has been a leading NGO advocating for the extension of UN Security Council mandated aid into Syria via crossborder.

References 

Organizations established in 2011
Organisations based in Manchester
Charities based in Manchester